The discography of Japanese contemporary R&B singer and Thelma Aoyama consists of seven studio albums, six compilation albums, one extended play, one remix album, one cover album, two video albums and numerous solo and collaboration singles. Aoyama debuted as a musician in 2007 under Universal Music Japan, and became famous through her collaboration song with rapper SoulJa, "Koko ni Iru yo". Aoyama's version "Soba ni Iru ne" became one of the most successful songs of all time in Japan, certified for three million ringtone downloads and three million downloads by the RIAJ.

Studio albums

Compilation albums

Cover albums

Extended plays

Remix albums

Singles

As a lead artist

As a featured artist

Promotional singles

Other charted songs

Other appearances

Video albums

Notes

References

Discographies of Japanese artists
Pop music discographies
Contemporary R&B discographies